Minuscule 164 (in the Gregory-Aland numbering), ε 116 (Soden), is a Greek minuscule manuscript of the New Testament, on parchment. It is dated by its colophon to the year 1039. It has complex contents, with full marginalia.

Description 

The codex contains a complete text of the four Gospels on 214 parchment leaves (size ). The text is written in one column per page, in 19 lines per page. The text of Matthew 7:12-8:4 on folios 15-16 was added by a later hand.

There is also a division according to the Ammonian Sections (in Mark 237 - 16:15), with references to the Eusebian Canons (written below Ammonian Section numbers).

The Synaxarion and Menologion were added by a later hand. It has the famous Jerusalem Colophon ("from the ancient manuscripts of Jerusalem").

Text 

Aland the Greek text of the codex did not place it in any Category. According to Black it represents the Alexandrian text-type. According to the Claremont Profile Method in Luke 1; 10; 20 it is close to Codex Tischendorfianus III and related to 1443.

The  Pericope Adulterae (John 7:53-8:11) is marked by an obelus.

History 

The subscription states that it was written by Leo, a priest and calligrapher, in October 1193, and bought in 1168 by Bartholomeus, who compared it with ancient Jerusalem manuscripts on the sacred mount.

It was examined by Birch (about 1782) and Scholz (1794–1852). C. R. Gregory saw the manuscript in 1886.

It is currently housed at the Vatican Library (Barberini gr. 319), at Rome.

See also 

 List of New Testament minuscules
 Biblical manuscript
 Textual criticism

References

Further reading 

 

Greek New Testament minuscules
12th-century biblical manuscripts
Manuscripts of the Vatican Library